Stand Up for the Week is a British television comedy series that was shown on Channel 4, featuring stand-up comedy performances reflecting topical events. The show began in June 2010 with a six-episode series aired on Friday nights, moving to Saturday nights for the second series which began in March 2011. The first series was hosted by Patrick Kielty, with regular performers Jack Whitehall, Kevin Bridges, Andi Osho and Rich Hall. Bridges replaced Kielty as host for the second series, with Jon Richardson joining as a regular performer. Richardson took over as host of the show for the third series which aired in late 2011, and aside from Rich Hall returning, an otherwise entirely new group of regular performers joined the show: Seann Walsh, Sara Pascoe, Josh Widdicombe and Paul Chowdhry.  For the fourth series Andrew Lawrence replaced Rich Hall. For the fifth series, Chowdhry took over as host and new regulars Angela Barnes, Simon Evans and Romesh Ranganathan replaced Chowdhry, Lawrence and Pascoe. In October 2015 Channel 4 confirmed there are no plans to produce more episodes of the show.

Format
Each episode features an introduction and performance from the host, and routines from the regular performers with the first two series also including routines from a guest performer. Some of the regular performers have specific themes. In the first series Whitehall's routine focused on celebrity news, Osho's on the internet, and Bridges' on sport, with Richardson taking on this theme at the start of the second series.

The first series also featured a segment called "The Chair", in which a celebrity guest sat through a two-minute comedy routine about themselves from Kielty, after which they had 30 seconds to talk about or defend themselves.

Production
The first two series were recorded at KOKO in Camden, London, in front of a live audience. The third series switched to the Clapham Grand in South London. An unaired "try out" episode was made before filming of the first series began.

Episodes

Series 1

Series 2

Series 3

Series 4

Series 5

References

External links

2010 British television series debuts
2013 British television series endings
2010s British comedy television series
British stand-up comedy television series
Channel 4 comedy
Television shows set in London